Luke Arscott (born 7 July 1984 in Plymouth, Devon) is a rugby union player for Bristol Rugby in the RFU Championship.

His position of choice is as a full-back. He previously played for Plymouth Albion in National League 1, before joining Bristol for the 2006–07 season. In February 2010, Arscott extended his contract at Bristol  However, he signed for Exeter Chiefs in June 2010, following Bristol's loss (to Exeter Chiefs) in the Championship final.

Arscott first started playing rugby for Devonport Services RFC in Plymouth before joining the Exeter Chiefs colts teams in 2000. He made his first team debut for Exeter Chiefs as a replacement in 2002. He went on to make four further appearances that season before joining Plymouth Albion.

On 3 June 2014 Luke joined Bath Rugby after leaving Exeter Chiefs. He was subsequently on loan from Bath Rugby to Bristol Rugby for the 2015–2016 season and rejoined Bristol on a permanent basis in the summer of 2016 on a 1-year contract.

References

External links
Premiership Rugby Player Profile
Exeter Chiefs Profile

1984 births
Living people
Exeter Chiefs players
People educated at St Boniface's Catholic College
Plymouth Albion R.F.C. players
Rugby union players from Plymouth, Devon